Patrick Abba Moro  (born 3 July 1956) is a Nigerian educational administrator, politician and former Minister of the Federal Ministry Of Interior. He is currently the  Pro-Chancellor and Chairman Governing Council of the University of Agriculture, Makurdi. In 2019, he was elected into the Senate of the Federal Republic of Nigeria replacing David Mark, a two-term senate president (6th and 7th Assembly) and one of the longest serving Senators in Nigeria.

Early life
Moro was born on 3 July 1956, in Okpokwu Local Government Area of Benue State, Nigeria. 
He had his primary education at LGEA special Primary School, Odessassa between 1963 and 1969. He later attended Emmanuel Secondary School at Ugbokolo from 1969 to 1974 before he proceeded to Federal Government College, Kano where he obtained a Higher School Certificate (HSC) in 1975.
He proceeded to the University of Lagos where he obtained a Bachelor of Science (B. sc) degree in Political Science and Master of Science (M. sc) degree in Public Administration in 1980 and 1983 respectively.

Academic career
Moro began his academic career at Benue State Polytechnic as a lecturer where he served as Head of the Department of General Studies for one year (1991-1992) and Head of the department of Public 
Administration for four years (1992-1996) and later as dean of studies, School of Business and Administration Studies. He served in that capacity for two years (1994-1996).
He was later elected as chairman of the Benue State Polytechnic chapter of Senior Staff Association of Nigeria. He served in that capacity for four years (1980 - 1984) before he was elected as the National President of Polytechnic Senior Staff of Nigeria in 1986.

Political career
Moro began his political career as elected Chairman of Okpokwu Local Government Council in 1998.
He was the People's Democratic Party candidate for the April 2007 Benue state governorship election but lost to the opposition party and in July 2011, he was appointed as honorable Minister of the Federal Ministry Of Interior by Goodluck Ebele Jonathan, the president of the Federal Republic of Nigeria. Moro was sued to court for fraud over a botched recruitment drive, which resulted in stampedes that left 20 people dead in 2014 and is currently facing trials. Moro was charged with fraud in relation to the stampede. Moro has pleaded not guilty to his role in an alleged $2.5m (£1.8m) fraud, involving missing application fees.
He was also charged to court by EFCC, over fatal N677m Immigration recruitment scam in 2014.
Moro of the People's Democratic Party (PDP) has emerged winner of the Benue South senatorial election. Moro scored 85, 162 votes to beat his main challenger, Steven Lawani of the All Progressives Congress (APC) who polled 47, 972.

Awards and honours
Patrick Moro had received several awards. Including:
Best peacemaker Award by MOO in Idoma land Otukpo
Award of Excellent contribution to education and development by National PTA
Award for distinction in Industrial Development by NULGE Benue State Chapter
Benue State Council NUT Honours Award Makurdi for the Best performing LGA Chairman 2001

See also
Emmanuel Iheanacho

References

Interior ministers of Nigeria
Nigerian politicians
1956 births
Living people
Idoma people
People from Benue State
People from Makurdi
University of Lagos alumni